Huperzia selago, the northern firmoss or fir clubmoss, is a vascular plant in the family Lycopodiaceae. It has a circumpolar distribution in temperate and boreal regions in both hemispheres.

Distribution and habitat
It is found in the northern parts of North America, Europe, and Asia. It is found in sandy pits, ditches, along lakeshores, and in conifer swamps.

In Europe, its range extends from Svalbard to the mountains of northern Spain and Italy, and from the British Isles east through central Asia to the Kamchatka peninsula, Japan, the Aleutian Islands, North America, Greenland and Iceland.

In the northeastern United States, it is found in boreal habitat, but not alpine zones.

Uses
"Upper Tanana Indians used the whole plant in a poultice applied to the head for headaches".

References

External links
  Huperzia selago at Plant-identification.co.uk

selago
Flora of North America
Flora of Europe
Flora of Asia